Making Mirrors is the third studio album by Belgian-Australian singer-songwriter Gotye, released in Australia on 19 August 2011. In December 2011 it was announced that Making Mirrors was voted Triple J listeners' number-one album of 2011, making Gotye the first artist to win the Triple J album poll twice. It included the single "Somebody That I Used to Know", which reached and topped charts worldwide. In Poland, only one day after release, the album was certified platinum. The album won the 2013 Grammy for Best Alternative Music Album. It is his first album since his 2006 album Like Drawing Blood (2006)

The album was largely recorded at a converted studio at Gotye's parents' farm in the Mornington Peninsula.

At the J Awards of 2011, the album won the Australian Album of the Year.

History
{{Quote box
| quote  = "Eyes Wide Open" saw Gotye explore new musical territory, with the main bass line from the song recorded on a fence: "I was out there with my old band called The Basics—and Winton is home to this phenomenal thing called the Winton Musical Fence, which is a large fence made out of metal strings stretched between posts [...] I sampled some bits there in 08 and they made it into [the song]."
—Gotye.
| width  = 20em
| align  = left
| quoted = 1
}}In mid-October 2010, Gotye released a single titled "Eyes Wide Open", the first track from the album. The single received generally positive reviews and reached #25 in the Triple J Hottest 100 of 2010. In late March 2010, Gotye revealed the album's title, which was inspired by an artwork De Backer chanced upon which was edited to create the album cover art. He claimed, "The mirror reflects on artwork and it is all very related to self-reflection and introspection on the album." Gotye also revealed that the album would see a release in June or July 2011, with a single to precede the release, along with the fact that the album would be similar to its predecessor in terms of diversity. Gotye went on to reveal that the release of the album was delayed for over five months due to the composition and recording of a single track.

On 19 May 2011, it was announced that this album would be released on 19 August 2011, with the album to be launched the following day at the Sydney Opera House as part of the Graphic Festival, with animators and a ten-piece orchestra as part of Gotye's performance. Gotye was also to issue a follow-up single to "Eyes Wide Open" titled "Somebody That I Used to Know", on 11 July 2011. Upon the announcement of the track listing, Gotye also revealed that there would be a DVD accompanying the record which would include music videos and documentaries. However, controversy erupted on 5 July 2011, when the video for the new single, "Somebody That I Used to Know", was leaked online via the Take 40 Australia website. Later that day, the song was aired for the first time on Triple J with the official stamp of approval from Gotye. Gotye released the single six days early, on 5 July 2011, through iTunes Australia, and his website for international followers.

The song has also reached #1 in the ARIA Singles Chart, and the ARIA Digital Singles Chart and #1 in the ARIA Australian Artists Chart. The song went on to be an international success charting in the top 20 in over 10 countries with 6 of them being at number one; the song also charted in the US and Canada. As of Friday 4 November, the single has received five times platinum sales and the #1 position on the Australian iTunes Store, making it one of the highest-selling singles of 2011. The single has officially been certified nine times platinum, selling over 630,000 copies, making it the most successful Australian song on the ARIA charts of all time. The album was certified two times platinum by the ARIA Albums Chart, making it the most successful Australian album of 2011. Since then, the album has been certified three times platinum, selling in excess of 210,000 copies in Australia. "Bronte" was released as the third single on 8 August 2011. "I Feel Better" was released as the fourth single from the album in Australia on 24 October 2011. The song, however, failed to reach the top 100. "Easy Way Out" was released in the UK as a promotional single on 3 November 2011. It was eventually released as the fifth single from Making Mirrors in Australia on 27 February 2012.

In 2013, the companion video album Video Mirrors was released, including 12 music videos and one featurette, with a runtime of 59 minutes.

Concept and themes
Shortly before its release, Gotye spoke to the Australian Broadcasting Corporation about the significance of the artwork, the title, and how it symbolises the creative and introspective process of recording the album; "It's more about reflection [...] little ways for me to explore my record collection, explore the world of sound that I'm fascinated by, and also sometimes get a different perspective on memories and emotions I've been mulling over".

Gotye revealed that the second single from the album, "Somebody That I Used to Know", was not lyrically the result of a single break-up. "It wasn't about one specific relationship," explained De Backer in an interview, "but it was definitely drawn from various experiences I've had in relationships breaking up."

Despite the album's huge success, Gotye revealed in an interview with Rolling Stone Australia that he initially battled with indecision and depression while making the album, which in turn became the subject matter of songs like "Smoke and Mirrors" (with a central theme of impostor syndrome) and "Save Me". He stated: "There were points that I thought I wouldn't be able to finish a record I was really into or that I'd give up at some stage."

According to an interview in The Age, the track "State of the Art" is about a secondhand 1970s organ Gotye's parents purchased. The accompanying music video is an animation showing a family purchasing and playing the instrument, which captivates and transforms the family into metal people resembling organ pipes.

Critical receptionMaking Mirrors received generally positive reviews from music critics. At Metacritic, which assigns a normalised rating out of 100 to reviews from mainstream critics, the album received an average score of 69, based on 19 reviews, which indicates "generally favorable reviews". Caitlin Welsh of The Music Network gave the album a favourable review, saying that it was "just as rich, cheeky and steeped in pop history and musicality as its predecessor and as constructed and addictive as its breakout track ('Somebody That I Used to Know'), it will cement Wally de Backer as the oddball, everyman genius of Australian pop." The Herald Sun gave it four out of five stars, adding that "Bronte and Giving Me a Chance are the latest in a long line of beautiful, visual songs begging to soundtrack the pivotal scene in a movie that's yet to be made." Radar Radio also gave Making Mirrors four out of five stars and regarding the track "Eyes Wide Open" said, "with lyrics like 'Some people offered up answers / We made out like we heard / but they were only words / They didn't add up to a change in the way we were living'. Now don't get me wrong, I have never been in a situation like this yet it feels so relatable." The album won the 2013 Grammy Award for Best Alternative Music Album.

Track listing

Personnel
Wally De Backer – lead and backing vocals, songwriter, samples, instruments
François Tétaz – dubs and spaces on "Making Mirrors"
Lucas Taranto – bass guitar on "Easy Way Out", "Somebody That I Used to Know", "I Feel Better", "Save Me", poker bass on "Eyes Wide Open", fretless bass on "Bronte"
Kimbra – lead and backing vocals on "Somebody That I Used to Know"
Gareth Skinner – whale cellos on "Eyes Wide Open"
Michael Hubbard – pedal steel guitar on "Eyes Wide Open"
Luke Hodgson – bass guitar on "I Feel Better"
Scott Tinkler – trumpet on "In Your Light"
Adam Simmons – saxophone on "In Your Light"
Frank De Backer – album artwork

Charts

Weekly charts

Year-end charts

Decade-end charts

Certifications

See also
 List of number-one albums of 2011 (Australia)
 List of number-one albums of 2012 (Poland)

Notes

References

External links
 Making Mirrors'' at Metacritic
 

2011 albums
Albums recorded in a home studio
ARIA Award-winning albums
Eleven: A Music Company albums
Gotye albums
Grammy Award for Best Alternative Music Album